The Menninger Foundation was founded in 1919 by the Menninger family in Topeka, Kansas.  The Menninger Foundation, known locally as Menninger's, consists of a clinic, a sanatorium, and a school of psychiatry, all of which bear the Menninger name.  Menninger's consisted of a campus at 5800 S.W. 6th Avenue in Topeka, Kansas which included a pool as well as the other aforementioned buildings. In 2003, the Menninger Clinic moved to Houston. The foundation was started in 1919 by Dr. Charles F. Menninger and his sons, Drs. Karl and William Menninger. It represented the first group psychiatry practice. "We had a vision," Dr. C. F. Menninger said, "of a better kind of medicine and a better kind of world."

History

The Menninger Clinic, also known as the C. F. Menninger Memorial Hospital, was founded in the 1920s in Topeka, Kansas. The Menninger Sanitarium was founded in 1925. The Menninger Clinic established the Southard School for children in 1926. The school fostered treatment programs for children and adolescents that were recognized worldwide. In the 1930s the Menningers expanded training programs for psychiatrists, psychologists, and other mental health professionals.

The Menninger Foundation was established in 1941. The Menninger School of Psychiatry was established in 1946. It quickly became the largest training center in the country, driven by the country's demand for psychiatrists to treat military veterans.

Menninger announced its affiliation with Baylor College of Medicine and The Methodist Hospital in December 2002. The concept was that Menninger would perform treatment while Baylor would oversee research and education.

Moves
The Menninger Clinic moved in June 2003 from Topeka, Kansas to Houston, Texas. The Menninger Clinic again moved to its new location at 12301 S. Main St., Houston, Texas, 77035 in May 2012.

Current facilities
As of May 2012, The Menninger Clinic offers: Adolescent Treatment Program, a Professionals Program, the Compass Program for Young Adults, the Comprehensive Psychiatric Assessment & Stabilization Program, an Assessments Service and the Hope Program for Adults.

Revolution in psychiatric education
The Menninger School of Psychiatry and the local Veterans Administration Hospital represented the center of a psychiatric education revolution. The Clinic and the School became the hub for training professionals in the bio-psycho-social approach. This approach integrated the foundations of medical, psychodynamic, developmental, and family systems to focus on the overall health of patients. For patients, this way of treatment attended to their physical, emotional, and social needs.

Dr. Otto Fleischmann, head of the psychoanalytic institute from 1956 to 1963, was doing psychotherapy behind a one-way vision screen, in full view of all the students.

In 1960 Otto Kernberg joined the Clinic and later become its director until 1965.

Karl Menninger

Dr. Karl Menninger's first book, The Human Mind (1930), became a bestseller and familiarized the American public with human behavior. Many Americans also read his subsequent books, including The Vital Balance, Man Against Himself and Love Against Hate.

Will Menninger

Dr. Will Menninger made a major contribution to the field of psychiatry when he developed a system of hospital treatment known as milieu therapy. This approach involved a patient's total environment in treatment. Dr. Menninger served as Chief of the Army Medical Corps' Psychiatric Division during World War II. Under his leadership, the Army reduced losses in personnel due to psychological impairment. In 1945, the Army promoted Dr. Menninger to brigadier general. After the war, Dr. Menninger led a national revolution to reform state sanitariums. In 1948, Time magazine featured Dr. Menninger on its cover, lauding him as "psychiatry’s U.S. sales manager."

Activities
At the Menninger Clinic, staff proceeded to launch new treatment approaches and open specialty programs. The Menninger Foundation gained a reputation for intensive, individualized treatment, particularly for patients with complex or long-standing symptoms. The treatment approach was multidimensional, addressing a patient's medical, psychological, and social needs. Numerous independent organizations recognized the Menninger Foundation as a world leader in psychiatric and behavioral health treatment. 

US News & World Report listed Houston’s Menninger Clinic #5 in Psychiatry on their annual list of best hospitals  The rankings are based on performance in meeting certain criteria, and are given a grade in each section and an overall scorecard. The eligibility requirements to participate are such that only 165 hospitals were considered for evaluation.

The Menninger Clinic remains one of the primary North American settings supporting psychodynamically informed research on clinical diagnosis, assessment, and treatment. Recently, efforts have been organized around the construct of mentalizing, a concept integrating research activities related to attachment, theory of mind, internal representations, and neuroscience.

In the 1960s the Menninger Clinic studied Swami Rama, a noted yogi, specifically investigating his ability to exercise voluntary control of bodily processes (such as heartbeat) which are normally considered non-voluntary (autonomous) as well as Yoga Nidra. It was part of Gardner Murphy's research program into creativity and the paranormal, funded by Ittleson Family Foundation.

See also
 Roy W. Menninger
 W. Walter Menninger
 Harriet Lerner
 Riley Gardner
 The New York Foundation

References 

 Lawrence Jacob Friedman, Menninger: The Family and the Clinic, University Press of Kansas, 1992 (Reprint)
 Robert S. Wallerstein, Forty-two lives in treatment : a study of psychoanalysis and psychotherapy : the report of the Psychotherapy Research Project of the Menninger Foundation, 1954-1982, New York : Other Press, 2000

External links
 Menninger Clinic official website
 Bulletin of the Menninger Clinic
 The Topeka Capital Journal's in-depth coverage of Menninger leaving Topeka - index page
 U.S. News & World Report psychiatric hospital rankings
 Menninger Foundation Archives from Kansas State Historical Society
 Access Menninger photographs and documents on Kansas Memory, the Kansas State Historical Society's digital portal
 ERICA GOODE - Famed Psychiatric Clinic Abandons Prairie Home - New York Times Article 2003
 Staff of Psychotherapy Research Project at Menninger in Topeka, Kansas, 1959, at Kansas Memory, not in PD
 

Biomedical research foundations
Mental health organizations in Kansas
History of psychiatry
Psychoanalysis in the United States
Mental health organizations in Texas
Medical and health foundations in the United States